The list of shipwrecks in July 1851 includes ships sunk, foundered, wrecked, grounded, or otherwise lost during July 1851.

1 July

2 July

3 July

4 July

5 July

6 July

7 July

8 July

9 July

10 July

11 July

12 July

13 July

14 July

15 July

16 July

17 July

19 July

20 July

21 July

22 July

23 July

24 July

25 July

26 July

27 July

28 July

29 July

30 July

31 July

Unknown date

References

1851-07